The nucleus ambiguus ("ambiguous nucleus" in English) is a group of large motor neurons, situated deep in the medullary reticular formation named by Jacob Clarke. The nucleus ambiguus contains the cell bodies of neurons that innervate the muscles of the soft palate, pharynx, and larynx which are associated with speech and swallowing. As well as motor neurons, the nucleus ambiguus contains preganglionic parasympathetic neurons which innervate postganglionic parasympathetic neurons in the heart.

It is a region of histologically disparate cells located just dorsal (posterior) to the inferior olivary nucleus in the lateral portion of the upper (rostral) medulla.  It receives upper motor neuron innervation directly via the corticobulbar tract.

This nucleus gives rise to the branchial efferent motor fibers of the vagus nerve (CN X) terminating in the laryngeal, pharyngeal muscles, and musculus uvulae; as well as to the efferent motor fibers of the glossopharyngeal nerve (CN IX) terminating in the stylopharyngeus muscle.

Function
The nucleus ambiguus controls the motor innervation of ipsilateral muscles of the soft palate, pharynx, larynx and upper esophagus. Lesions of nucleus ambiguus results in nasal speech, dysphagia, dysphonia, and deviation of the uvula toward the contralateral side. Preganglionic parasympathetics to the heart also flow through the external formation of the nucleus.

Areas supplied
The muscles supplied by the vagus (included with this is the  cranial root of the accessory nerve), such as levator veli palatini, are also necessary to swallow properly through integration by the nucleus of the solitary tract. The vagus also supplies the upper part of the esophagus, and other parts of the pharynx and larynx.

As well as motor neurons, the nucleus ambiguus in its "external formation" contains cholinergic preganglionic parasympathetic neurons for the heart. These neurons are cardioinhibitory.  This cardioinhibitory effect is one of the means by which quick changes in blood pressure are achieved by the central nervous system (the primary means being changes in sympathetic nervous system activity, which constricts arterioles and makes the heart pump faster and harder).  That is, through integrated and antagonistic system with sympathetic outflow from the vasomotor center of the brainstem, the parasympathetic outflow arising from the nucleus ambiguus and dorsal motor nucleus of the vagus nerve acts to decrease cardiac activity in response to fast increases in blood pressure. The external formation of the nucleus ambiguus also sends bronchoconstrictor fibers to the bronchopulmonary system, which can produce reflexive decreases in pulmonary bronchial airflow. The pathophysiologic relevance of this system, which may act in concert with the cardioinhibitory system, is poorly understood, but likely plays a role in bronchospastic diseases like COPD/emphysema (in which inhaled anticholinergic medications such as Spiriva/tiotropium or ipratropium are standard-of-care treatment) and asthma, particularly for exercise-related asthma exacerbations, which may have a component of autonomic dysregulation.

Additional images

References

External links
 Medical Neurosciences discuss the nucleus ambiguus.

Ambiguus
Medulla oblongata
Vagus nerve